Kofi Konadu Apraku is a Ghanaian politician and economist and a member of the 2nd, 3rd and 4th Parliament of the 4th Republic of Ghana . He is a member of the New Patriotic Party. He was the Member of Parliament for the Offinso North constituency in the fourth parliament of the fourth Republic of Ghana.

Early life and education 
Konadu Apraku was born at Akumadan in the Asante region of Ghana on 7 September 1954. He attended Tweneboa Kodua Secondary School between 1967 and 1972 and furthered his education in South Albany High School in Oregon, U.S.A. after winning an AFS International essay competition after which he studied for economics degrees at the Oregon State University taking a doctorate in the subject.

Career 
Kofi Konadu Apraku was Minister for Regional Cooperation and NEPAD in John Kufuor's administration from 2003 to 2006. He also served as the Minister of Trade and Industry under Kufour from 2001 to 2003. In the year 2008 he was appointed by the Economic Community of West African States (ECOWAS) Council of Ministers as ECOWAS Commissioner for Macroeconomic Policy and Economic Research where he is responsible for Multilateral surveillance mechanism which involves regular assessment through joint surveillance mission of the economies of ECOWAS members’ state to ascertain whether the convergences criteria are being met and provide economic and statistical data for member sate and help them attain the convergence criteria and the ECOWAS single currency.  He is also liaises with the World Bank, the International Monetary Fund [IMF], African Development Bank among other financial institution to support the development of ECOWAS regions.

Politics 
Kofi Konadu Apraku was first voted into parliament on 7 January 1997 to represent his constituency. He polled 10,456 votes out of the 21,428 valid votes cast representing 37.80%. He contested against Nana Oduro-Baah an NDC member who polled 10,257 votes representing 37.10%, Manu Yaw Joseph and PNC member who polled 358 votes representing 1.30% and Emmanuel Kwame Boakye an IND member who polled 357 votes representing 1.30%.

He was the reelected on 7 January 2001 after he emerged winner of the 2000 Ghanaian General Elections and polled 13,160 votes out of the 21,543 valid votes cast representing 61.00%. He was also re-elected as the Member of Parliament for Offinso North Constituency of the Asante Region in the 2004 Ghanaian general elections with a sum total votes of

13,389 representing 50.30% of the total votes cast. He was among the 17 aspirants who contested in 2007 for the slot of flag-bearer of the New Patriotic Party, going into the 2008 elections.

Personal life 
Kofi Konadu Apraku is a devoted Christian.

See also 
List of MPs elected in the 2004 Ghanaian parliamentary election

References 

1954 births
New Patriotic Party politicians
Oregon State University alumni
Ghanaian MPs 2005–2009
Living people
People from Ashanti Region
Ghanaian MPs 1997–2001
Ghanaian MPs 2001–2005